Ivan Petrovich Pavlov (27 February 1936), was a Russian and Soviet experimental neurologist, psychologist and physiologist known for his discovery of classical conditioning through his experiments with dogs.

Education and early life

Ivan Petrovich Pavlov, the first of eleven children, was born in Ryazan, Russian Empire. His father, Peter Dmitrievich Pavlov (1823–1899), was a village Russian orthodox priest. His mother, Varvara Ivanovna Uspenskaya (1826–1890), was a devoted homemaker. As a child, Pavlov willingly participated in house duties such as doing the dishes and taking care of his siblings. He loved to garden, ride his bicycle, row, swim, and play gorodki; he devoted his summer vacations to these activities. Although able to read by the age of seven, Pavlov was seriously injured when he fell from a high wall onto a stone pavement. As a result of the injuries he sustained he did not begin formal schooling until he was 11 years old.

From his childhood days, Pavlov demonstrated intellectual curiosity along with an unusual energy which he referred to as "the instinct for research". Inspired by the progressive ideas which Dmitry Pisarev, a Russian literary critic of the 1860s, and Ivan Sechenov, the father of Russian physiology, were spreading, Pavlov abandoned his religious career and devoted his life to science. In 1870, he enrolled in the physics and mathematics department at the University of Saint Petersburg to study natural science.

Pavlov attended the Ryazan church school before entering the local theological seminary. In 1870, however, he left the seminary without graduating to attend the university at St. Petersburg. There he enrolled in the physics and math department and took natural science courses. In his fourth year, his first research project on the physiology of the nerves of the pancreas won him a prestigious university award. In 1875, Pavlov completed his course with an outstanding record and received the degree of Candidate of Natural Sciences. Impelled by his overwhelming interest in physiology, Pavlov decided to continue his studies and proceeded to the Imperial Academy of Medical Surgery. While at the academy, Pavlov became an assistant to his former teacher, Elias von Cyon. He left the department when de Cyon was replaced by another instructor.

After some time, Pavlov obtained a position as a laboratory assistant to Konstantin Nikolaevich Ustimovich at the physiological department of the Veterinary Institute. For two years, Pavlov investigated the circulatory system for his medical dissertation. In 1878, Professor S. P. Botkin, a famous Russian clinician, invited the gifted young physiologist to work in the physiological laboratory as the clinic's chief. In 1879, Pavlov graduated from the Medical Military Academy with a gold medal award for his research work. After a competitive examination, Pavlov won a fellowship at the academy for postgraduate work. 

The fellowship and his position as director of the Physiological Laboratory at Botkin's clinic enabled Pavlov to continue his research work. In 1883, he presented his doctor's thesis on the subject of The centrifugal nerves of the heart and posited the idea of nervism and the basic principles on the trophic function of the nervous system. Additionally, his collaboration with the Botkin Clinic produced evidence of a basic pattern in the regulation of reflexes in the activity of circulatory organs.

Influences
He was inspired to pursue a scientific career by D. I. Pisarev, a literary critique and natural science advocate of the time and I. M. Sechenov, a Russian physiologist, whom Pavlov described as "the father of physiology".

Career
After completing his doctorate, Pavlov went to Germany, where he studied in Leipzig with Carl Ludwig and Eimear Kelly in the Heidenhain laboratories in Breslau. He remained there from 1884 to 1886. Heidenhain was studying digestion in dogs, using an exteriorized section of the stomach. However, Pavlov perfected the technique by overcoming the problem of maintaining the external nerve supply. The exteriorized section became known as the Heidenhain or Pavlov pouch.

In 1886, Pavlov returned to Russia to look for a new position. His application for the chair of physiology at the University of Saint Petersburg was rejected. Eventually, Pavlov was offered the chair of pharmacology at Tomsk University in Siberia and at the University of Warsaw in Poland. He did not take up either post. In 1890, he was appointed the role of professor of Pharmacology at the Military Medical Academy and occupied the position for five years. In 1891, Pavlov was invited to the Institute of Experimental Medicine in St. Petersburg to organize and direct the Department of Physiology.

Over a 45-year period, under his direction, the institute became one of the most important centers of physiological research in the world. Pavlov continued to direct the Department of Physiology at the institute, while taking up the chair of physiology at the Medical Military Academy in 1895. Pavlov would head the physiology department at the academy continuously for three decades.

Starting in 1901, Pavlov was nominated over four successive years for the Nobel Prize in Physiology or Medicine. He did not win the prize until 1904 because his previous nominations were not specific to any discovery, but based on a variety of laboratory findings. When Pavlov received the Nobel Prize it was specified that he did so "in recognition of his work on the physiology of digestion, through which knowledge on vital aspects of the subject has been transformed and enlarged".

It was at the Institute of Experimental Medicine that Pavlov carried out his classical experiments on the digestive glands, which would eventually grant him the aforementioned Nobel prize. Pavlov investigated the gastric function of dogs, and later, homeless children, by externalizing a salivary gland so he could collect, measure, and analyze the saliva and what response it had to food under different conditions. He noticed that the dogs tended to salivate before food was actually delivered to their mouths, and set out to investigate this "psychic secretion", as he called it. Experiments on orphaned children, involving drilling a hole in their cheeks and applying electric shocks, were continued by his assistant Nikolay Krasnogorsky.

Pavlov's laboratory housed a full-scale kennel for the experimental canines. Pavlov was interested in observing their long-term physiological processes. This required keeping them alive and healthy to conduct chronic experiments, as he called them. These were experiments over time, designed to understand the normal functions of dogs. This was a new kind of study, because previously experiments had been "acute," meaning that the dog went through vivisection which ultimately killed the canine in the process.

A 1921 article by S. Morgulis in the journal Science was critical of Pavlov's work, raising concerns about the environment in which these experiments had been performed. Based on a report from H. G. Wells, claiming that Pavlov grew potatoes and carrots in his laboratory the article stated, "It is gratifying to be assured that Professor Pavlov is raising potatoes only as a pastime and still gives the best of his genius to scientific investigation". That same year, Pavlov began holding laboratory meetings known as the 'Wednesday meetings' at which he spoke frankly on many topics, including his views on psychology. These meetings lasted until he died in 1936.

Pavlov was highly regarded by the Soviet government, and he was able to continue his research until he reached a considerable age. He was praised by Lenin. Despite praise from the Soviet Union government, the money that poured in to support his laboratory, and the honours he was given, Pavlov made no attempts to conceal the disapproval and contempt with which he regarded Soviet Communism.

In 1923, he stated that he would not sacrifice even the hind leg of a frog to the type of social experiment that the regime was conducting in Russia. Four years later he wrote to Stalin, protesting at what was being done to Russian intellectuals and saying he was ashamed to be a Russian. After the murder of Sergei Kirov in 1934, Pavlov wrote several letters to Molotov criticizing the mass persecutions which followed and asking for the reconsideration of cases pertaining to several people he knew personally.

Conscious until his final moment, Pavlov asked one of his students to sit beside his bed and to record the circumstances of his dying. He wanted to create unique evidence of subjective experiences of this terminal phase of life. Pavlov died of double pneumonia at the age of 86. He was given a grand funeral, and his study and laboratory were preserved as a museum in his honour. His grave is in the Literatorskie mostki (writers' footways) section of Volkovo Cemetery in St. Petersburg.

Reflex system research

Pavlov contributed to many areas of physiology and neurological sciences. Most of his work involved research in temperament, conditioning and involuntary reflex actions.
Pavlov performed and directed experiments on digestion, eventually publishing The Work of the Digestive Glands in 1897, after 12 years of research. His experiments earned him the 1904 Nobel Prize in Physiology and Medicine. 

These experiments included surgically extracting portions of the digestive system from nonhuman animals, severing nerve bundles to determine the effects, and implanting fistulas between digestive organs and an external pouch to examine the organ's contents. This research served as a base for broad research on the digestive system. Further work on reflex actions involved involuntary reactions to stress and pain.

Research on types and properties of nervous systems

Pavlov was always interested in biomarkers of temperament types described by Hippocrates and Galen. He called these biomarkers "properties of nervous systems" and identified three main properties: (1) strength, (2) mobility of nervous processes and (3) a balance between excitation and inhibition and derived four types based on these three properties. He extended the definitions of the four temperament types under study at the time: phlegmatic, choleric, sanguine, and melancholic, updating the names to "the strong and impetuous type, the strong equilibrated and quiet type, the strong equilibrated and lively type, and the weak type."

Pavlov and his researchers observed and began the study of transmarginal inhibition (TMI), the body's natural response of shutting down when exposed to overwhelming stress or pain by electric shock. This research showed how all temperament types responded to the stimuli the same way, but different temperaments move through the responses at different times. He commented "that the most basic inherited difference ... was how soon they reached this shutdown point and that the quick-to-shut-down have a fundamentally different type of nervous system."

Pavlov carried out experiments on the digestive glands, as well as investigated the gastric function of dogs, and eventually won the Nobel Prize for Physiology or Medicine in 1904, becoming the first Russian Nobel laureate. A survey in the Review of General Psychology, published in 2002, ranked Pavlov as the 24th most cited psychologist of the 20th century. 

Pavlov's principles of classical conditioning have been found to operate across a variety of behavior therapies and in experimental and clinical settings, such as educational classrooms and even reducing phobias with systematic desensitization.

Pavlov on education
The basics of Pavlov's classical conditioning serve as a historical backdrop for current learning theories. However, the Russian physiologist's initial interest in classical conditioning occurred almost by accident during one of his experiments on digestion in dogs. Considering that Pavlov worked closely with nonhuman animals throughout many of his experiments, his early contributions were primarily about learning in nonhuman animals. However, the fundamentals of classical conditioning have been examined across many different organisms, including humans. The basic underlying principles of Pavlov's classical conditioning have extended to a variety of settings, such as classrooms and learning environments.

Classical conditioning focuses on using preceding conditions to alter behavioral reactions. The principles underlying classical conditioning have influenced preventative antecedent control strategies used in the classroom. Classical conditioning set the groundwork for the present day behavior modification practices, such as antecedent control. Antecedent events and conditions are defined as those conditions occurring before the behavior. Pavlov's early experiments used manipulation of events or stimuli preceding behavior (i.e., a tone) to produce salivation in dogs much like teachers manipulate instruction and learning environments to produce positive behaviors or decrease maladaptive behaviors. Although he did not refer to the tone as an antecedent, Pavlov was one of the first scientists to demonstrate the relationship between environmental stimuli and behavioral responses. Pavlov systematically presented and withdrew stimuli to determine the antecedents that were eliciting responses, which is similar to the ways in which educational professionals conduct functional behavior assessments. Antecedent strategies are supported by empirical evidence to operate implicitly within classroom environments. Antecedent-based interventions are supported by research to be preventative, and to produce immediate reductions in problem behaviors.

Legacy
The concept for which Pavlov is famous is the "conditioned reflex" (or in his own words the conditional reflex), which he developed jointly with his assistant Ivan Tolochinov in 1901 (although Edwin B. Twitmyer, at the University of Pennsylvania, published similar research in 1902, a year before Pavlov published his). The concept was developed after observing the rates of salivation in dogs. Pavlov noticed that his dogs began to salivate in the presence of the technician who normally fed them, rather than simply salivating in the presence of the food. If a buzzer or metronome was sounded before the food was given, the dog would later come to associate the sound with the presentation of the food and salivate upon the presentation of the sound stimulus alone.
Tolochinov, whose own term for the phenomenon had been "reflex at a distance", communicated the results at the Congress of Natural Sciences in Helsinki in 1903. Later the same year Pavlov more fully explained the findings, at the 14th International Medical Congress in Madrid, where he read a paper titled The Experimental Psychology and Psychopathology of Animals.

As Pavlov's work became known in the West, particularly through the writings of John B. Watson and B. F. Skinner, the idea of "conditioning", as an automatic form of learning, became a key concept in the developing specialism of comparative psychology, and the general approach to psychology that underlay it, behaviorism. Pavlov's work with classical conditioning was of huge influence on how humans perceived themselves, their behavior and learning processes; his studies of classical conditioning continue to be central to modern behavior therapy. 

British philosopher Bertrand Russell observed that "[w]hether Pavlov's methods can be made to cover the whole of human behaviour is open to question, but at any rate they cover a very large field and within this field they have shown how to apply scientific methods with quantitative exactitude".

Pavlov's research on conditional reflexes greatly influenced not only science, but also popular culture. Pavlovian conditioning is a major theme in Aldous Huxley's dystopian novel, Brave New World, and in Thomas Pynchon's Gravity's Rainbow.

It is popularly believed that Pavlov always signaled the occurrence of food by ringing a bell. However, his writings record the use of a wide variety of stimuli, including electric shocks, whistles, metronomes, tuning forks, and a range of visual stimuli, in addition to the ring of a bell. In 1994, Catania cast doubt on whether Pavlov ever actually used a bell in his experiments. Littman tentatively attributed the popular imagery to Pavlov's contemporaries Vladimir Mikhailovich Bekhterev and John B. Watson. Roger K. Thomas, of the University of Georgia, however, said they had found "three additional references to Pavlov's use of a bell that strongly challenge Littman's argument". In reply, Littman suggested that Catania's recollection, that Pavlov did not use a bell in research, was "convincing ... and correct".

In 1964, the psychologist H. J. Eysenck reviewed Pavlov's "Lectures on Conditioned Reflexes" for the British Medical Journal: Volume I – "Twenty-five Years of Objective Study of the Higher Nervous Activity of Animals", Volume II – "Conditioned Reflexes and Psychiatry".

The Pavlov Institute of Physiology of the Russian Academy of Sciences was founded by Pavlov in 1925 and named after him following his death.

Awards and honours
Pavlov was awarded the Nobel Prize in Physiology or Medicine in 1904. He was elected a Foreign Member of the Royal Society (ForMemRS) in 1907 
and was awarded the Royal Society's Copley Medal in 1915. He became a foreign member of the Royal Netherlands Academy of Arts and Sciences in 1907. Pavlov's dog, the Pavlovian session and Pavlov's typology are named in his honour. The asteroid 1007 Pawlowia and the lunar crater Pavlov were also named after him.

Personal life

Ivan Pavlov married Seraphima Vasilievna Karchevskaya on 1 May 1881, whom he had met in 1878 or 1879 when she went to St. Petersburg to study at the Pedagogical Institute. Seraphima, called Sara for short, was born in 1855. In her later years, she suffered from ill health and died in 1947.

The first nine years of their marriage were marred by financial problems; Pavlov and his wife often had to stay with others to have a home, and for a time, the two lived apart so that they could find hospitality. Although their poverty caused despair, material welfare was a secondary consideration. Sara's first pregnancy ended in a miscarriage. When she conceived again, the couple took precautions, and she safely gave birth to their first child, a boy whom they named Mirchik; Sara became deeply depressed following Mirchik's sudden death in childhood.

Ivan and Sara eventually had four more children: Vladimir, Victor, Vsevolod, and Vera. Their youngest son, Vsevolod, died of pancreatic cancer in 1935, only one year before his father. Pavlov was an atheist.

See also

 Orienting response
 Rostov State Medical University
 Georgii Zeliony

References

Sources

Further reading

External links

 PBS article
 Institute of Experimental Medicine article on Pavlov
 Link to a list of Pavlov's dogs with some pictures
 Commentary on Pavlov's Conditioned Reflexes from 50 Psychology Classics
 Ivan Pavlov and his dogs
 Ivan P. Pavlov: Toward a Scientific Psychology and Psychiatry
 
 
 
  including the Nobel Lecture on 12 December 1904 Physiology of Digestion

1849 births
1936 deaths
People from Ryazan
Animal trainers
Ethologists
Foreign associates of the National Academy of Sciences
Foreign Members of the Royal Society
Full Members of the Russian Academy of Sciences (1917–1925)
Full members of the Saint Petersburg Academy of Sciences
Full Members of the USSR Academy of Sciences
History of neuroscience
Members of the French Academy of Sciences
Members of the Royal Irish Academy
Members of the Royal Netherlands Academy of Arts and Sciences
Nobel laureates in Physiology or Medicine
Scientists from Saint Petersburg
Recipients of the Copley Medal
Atheists from the Russian Empire
Educational theorists from the Russian Empire
Nobel laureates from the Russian Empire
Saint Petersburg State University alumni
Psychologists from Saint Petersburg
Soviet physiologists
Physiologists from the Russian Empire
19th-century psychologists
20th-century psychologists
Lamarckism
Human subject research in Russia